Anabuki (written: 穴吹) is a Japanese surname. Notable people with the surname include:

, Japanese World War II flying ace
, Japanese baseball player and manager

Fictional characters
Tomoko Anabuki, protagonist in the light novel version of Strike Witches

Japanese-language surnames